David Digby Rendel (15 April 1949 – 16 May 2016) was a British politician for the Liberal Democrats. He was the Member of Parliament (MP) for Newbury from 1993 to 2005. He won the seat in a by-election in May 1993 caused by the death of Judith Chaplin, and he held it until his defeat at the 2005 general election to Conservative candidate Richard Benyon. At the time he lost his seat he was the Liberal Democrats' spokesman on Higher and Further Education. In September 2014, Rendel was selected as Liberal Democrat candidate in the 2015 general election for the seat of Somerton and Frome in Somerset; however, he lost to the Conservative candidate, David Warburton.

Early life 
Rendel was born in Athens. He was educated at Eton College, Magdalen College, Oxford, and St Cross College, Oxford, Rendel was a member of the winning Oxford boat race crew of 1974. After a gap year volunteering in Africa, he worked in the finance department of Shell Oil Company.

His father Sandy Rendel was a SOE agent and foreign correspondent for The Times, and he was a great-grandson of civil engineer Sir Alexander Meadows Rendel, and a great-great-nephew of Liberal MP Stuart Rendel.

Political career 
Rendel fought and lost two elections in 1979 and 1983 at Fulham, before moving to Newbury in 1986, when his wife started work as a GP. 
He became a Newbury District Councillor from 1987 to 1995, and fought the Newbury seat unsuccessfully in the 1992 general election, gaining 37% of the votes.

He won the 1993 Newbury by-election with a large majority of 22,055, receiving 65% of the votes. He first came to national attention for supporting the Newbury bypass, and in 1999 stood in the election for the leadership of the Liberal Democrats, but came fifth of five candidates, with Charles Kennedy being elected.

Rendel held on to his seat in 1997 and 2001 with reduced majorities, but at the 2005 election he was defeated by the Conservative candidate, Richard Benyon.
 
Rendel was a directly elected member of the Liberal Democrats’ Federal Executive committee until 2014.

In May 2006, Rendel was selected by local party members as the Liberal Democrat candidate for the Newbury seat for the next election. At the  general election in May 2010, he was again defeated by the sitting Conservative, Richard Benyon, whose majority grew to 21%.

After the election of 2010, Rendel was the only member on the party's Federal Executive to vote against the proposal that the party form a coalition government with the Conservatives.

Death
Rendel died from cancer in Berkshire on 16 May 2016, aged 67.

References

External links
David Rendel profile at the site of Liberal Democrats
Guardian Politics Ask Aristotle – David Rendel
TheyWorkForYou.com – David Rendel
The Public Whip – David Rendel voting record
BBC News – David Rendel  profile 10 February 2005

1949 births
2016 deaths
Alumni of Magdalen College, Oxford
Alumni of St Cross College, Oxford
Councillors in Berkshire
Deaths from cancer in England
Liberal Democrats (UK) MPs for English constituencies
Liberal Democrats (UK) councillors
Liberal Party (UK) parliamentary candidates
Newbury, Berkshire
People educated at Eton College
UK MPs 1992–1997
UK MPs 1997–2001
UK MPs 2001–2005